Brinian is a village on the island of Rousay, in Orkney, Scotland. Trumland is situated to the west of the village, with Taversöe Tuick nearby. Brinian is within the parish of Rousay and Egilsay.

References

External links

Around Rousay - Brinian
GEN UKI - Brinian Kirkyard
The Megalithic Portal - Cubbie Roo's Burden
Undiscovered Scotland - Taversoe Tuick Cairn

Villages in Orkney